Treylon Burks (born March 23, 2000) is an American football wide receiver for the Tennessee Titans of the National Football League (NFL). He played college football at Arkansas and was drafted by the Titans in the first round of the 2022 NFL Draft.

Early life and high school career
Burks was born on March 23, 2000, in Flint, Michigan and grew up in Warren, Arkansas. He attended Warren High School, where he played wide receiver for their football team and totaled 151 receptions for 3,403 yards and 43 touchdowns. He missed most of his senior season in 2018 after tearing his ACL. On July 30, 2018, he committed to the University of Arkansas to play college football. He was a four-star recruit and was the 103rd ranked recruit in the nation, and the number one recruit in Arkansas.  He also played basketball and baseball in high school.

College career
As a true freshman at Arkansas in 2019, Burks started nine of 11 games and recorded 29 receptions for 475 receiving yards. Burks was named 2nd Team All-SEC as a return specialist by the Coaches, and was placed on the SEC All-Freshman team. In 2020, he became Arkansas' number one receiver as a sophomore, with 51 receptions for 820 yards and seven touchdowns despite starting only eight games. Burks was named 2nd Team All-SEC by the AP and Coaches. In his junior season of 2021, Burks started all twelve games and finished with 66 receptions for 1,104 receiving yards and 11 receiving touchdowns, becoming only the fourth player in program history with over 1,000 yards receiving in a single season. He had 14 carries for 112 yards rushing and one rushing touchdown. Burks was named 1st Team All-SEC by the AP and the Coaches. Arkansas would finish the regular season 8-4, 4-4 in SEC play, and would be invited to play Penn State in the 2022 Outback Bowl on New Year's Day in Tampa. Burks decided to forgo participation in the Outback Bowl and also skip his senior season, declaring his intentions to enter the 2022 NFL Draft.

Professional career

Burks was drafted 18th overall by the Tennessee Titans in 2022. To obtain the draft pick from the Philadelphia Eagles, Tennessee traded away receiver A. J. Brown, also receiving a third round pick in 2023. He suffered turf toe in Week 4 and was placed on injured reserve on October 8. He was activated from injured reserve on November 12, 2022. In Week 11, against the Green Bay Packers, he had seven receptions for 111 receiving yards in the 27–17 victory. In Week 12, against the Cincinnati Bengals, he scored his first NFL touchdown on an unusual fumble recovery in the endzone in the 20–16 loss. In the following game, a 35–10 loss to the Philadelphia Eagles, he scored his first professional receiving touchdown on a 25-yard reception. Burks appeared in 11 games as a rookie and finished with 33 receptions for 444 receiving yards and one receiving touchdown.

NFL career statistics

Personal life
Burks is an avid hog hunter. He suffers from asthma, though it has never affected him during a game.

References

External links

Tennessee Titans bio
Arkansas Razorbacks bio

2000 births
Living people
People from Warren, Arkansas
Players of American football from Arkansas
American football wide receivers
Arkansas Razorbacks football players
Tennessee Titans players